The Diocese of Edmonton is a diocese of the Ecclesiastical Province of Rupert's Land of the Anglican Church of Canada.  The diocese comprises over 126,000 square kilometres of the civil Province of Alberta, consisting of a band across the central part of the province, extending to the borders of the adjacent provinces of British Columbia to the west and Saskatchewan to the east.  Its See city is Edmonton, and its roughly 7,000 Anglicans on parish rolls are served by 53 parishes, according to the most recent figures published by the Anglican Church of Canada.

The diocese was established in 1913 when it was divided from the Diocese of Calgary (which in turn had been divided from the Diocese of Saskatchewan in 1888).  The following year, the diocese was incorporated by the Alberta legislature.

Edmonton is the major city within the diocese.  Other communities are a mix of small, rural centres and suburban bedroom communities of the capital.

A lay order, the Company of the Cross ran the Saint John's School of Alberta which closed in 2008.  In the past, the school and order were specifically under the control of the diocese and bishop.

Bishops of Edmonton

References

External links
 Diocesan website.
 Diocese of Edmonton Cursillo.
 St. Mary & St. George Parish, Jasper. Alberta Ministry of Culture; Historic Resource.

Christian organizations established in 1913
Edmonton, Anglican Diocese of

Religious sees in Edmonton
Anglican dioceses established in the 20th century
1913 establishments in Alberta
Anglican Province of Rupert's Land